Jared Mark Deacon (born 15 October 1975) is a male British former sprint athlete who specialised in the 400 metres. He was born in South Shields and competed in the 2000 Summer Olympics.

Athletics career
He was a regular feature in the international British 4×400 metres relay team, competing at the 1999 World Championships in Athletics, the 2003 IAAF World Indoor Championships and was also a three-time relay medallist at the Summer Universiade from 1995 to 1999.

He represented England and won a silver medal in the 4 x 400 metres relay event, at the 1998 Commonwealth Games in Kuala Lumpur, Malaysia. The other team members consisted of Solomon Wariso, Mark Richardson, Paul Slythe, Sean Baldock and Mark Hylton.

He was a relay gold medallist for Great Britain at the 2002 European Athletics Championships and for England at the 2002 Commonwealth Games.

References

1975 births
Living people
British male sprinters
Olympic athletes of Great Britain
Athletes (track and field) at the 1998 Commonwealth Games
Athletes (track and field) at the 2002 Commonwealth Games
Athletes (track and field) at the 2000 Summer Olympics
European Athletics Championships medalists
Sportspeople from South Shields
English male sprinters
World Athletics Championships athletes for Great Britain
Commonwealth Games medallists in athletics
Commonwealth Games gold medallists for England
Universiade medalists in athletics (track and field)
Universiade silver medalists for Great Britain
Universiade bronze medalists for Great Britain
World Athletics Indoor Championships medalists
Medalists at the 1995 Summer Universiade
Medalists at the 1997 Summer Universiade
Medalists at the 1999 Summer Universiade
20th-century British people
Medallists at the 1998 Commonwealth Games
Medallists at the 2002 Commonwealth Games